Marcel Podszus (born 20 August 1976, in Viersen) is a German footballer who last played for VfB Speldorf.

Career
He spent one season in the Bundesliga with Borussia Mönchengladbach.

References 

1976 births
Living people
German footballers
Bundesliga players
2. Bundesliga players
Bayer 04 Leverkusen II players
Chemnitzer FC players
SC Fortuna Köln players
Borussia Mönchengladbach players
Borussia Mönchengladbach II players
Fortuna Düsseldorf players
VfB Remscheid players
Association football forwards
German people of Hungarian descent
People from Viersen
Sportspeople from Düsseldorf (region)
Footballers from North Rhine-Westphalia